= Omar Ben al-Khatib Warriors =

The Omar Ben al-Khatib Warriors was a name used by a Palestinian militant organization that claims to support the Palestinian National Authority (PNA).

The Omar Ben al-Khatib Warriors has claimed responsibility for a single action, namely the October 7, 2005, kidnapping of three members of Hamas, in response to the kidnapping of a Palestinian National Authority (PNA) intelligence officer. It is believed by many, however, including Hamas members, that the Omar Ben al-Khatib group is in reality a fictional entity invented to cover for actions by Fatah or the PNA secret services.
